Årset is a village in Nærøysund municipality in Trøndelag county, Norway. The village is located along the shore of Årsetfjorden. on the southeast side of the island of Austra.

References

Villages in Trøndelag
Nærøysund
Nærøy